Jamir is an Ao Naga surname. Notable people with the surname include:

 Merenka Jamir (born 1998), Indian cricketer
 Metsubo Jamir, Indian politician
 Piyong Temjen Jamir (1948–2018), Hindu scholar
 S.C. Jamir (born 1931), Indian politician
 Temjentoshi Jamir (born 1985), Indian cricketer

Surnames of Naga origin
Naga-language surnames